The Days of Pearly Spencer is a compilation album by The Vietnam Veterans, released in 1988. It was the band's last full-length album before they broke up.

Their record label gave the following statement: "The Vietnam Veterans are no more. This album contains material which was recorded during long night sessions, but remained unreleased. With the re-recordings of the old "demo" songs, they want to prove that they are better than ever. Now it's time to die!"

The Vietnam Veterans has later come to life again, and released a new full-length album in 2009.

Track listing

Label
This album was released by Music Maniac Records, Germany

References

The Vietnam Veterans albums

1988 compilation albums